Asota suffusa is a moth of the family Erebidae first described by Snellen in 1891. It is found on Alor Island, Flores and Sumbawa in Indonesia.

The wingspan is about 56 mm.

References

Asota (moth)
Moths of Indonesia
Moths described in 1891